Clifton Campville is a civil parish in the district of Lichfield, Staffordshire, England.  It contains 17 listed buildings that are recorded in the National Heritage List for England.  Of these, one is at Grade I, the highest of the three grades, two are at Grade II*, the middle grade, and the others are at Grade II, the lowest grade.  The parish contains the villages of Clifton Campville and Haunton, and is otherwise rural.  The listed buildings consist of two churches, a small country house and its associated coach house and stable, smaller houses, farmhouses and associated structures, a public house, a former convent, and a milepost.


Key

Buildings

References

Citations

Sources

Lists of listed buildings in Staffordshire